Domenico Matteucci (1 March 1895 – 19 July 1976) was an Italian pistol sports shooter who competed in the 1932 Summer Olympics. In 1932 he won the bronze medal in the 25 metre rapid fire pistol event.

References

External links
 profile

1895 births
1976 deaths
Italian male sport shooters
Olympic shooters of Italy
Shooters at the 1932 Summer Olympics
Olympic bronze medalists for Italy
ISSF pistol shooters
Olympic medalists in shooting
Medalists at the 1932 Summer Olympics